Porcelain is the second album by the band Sparta. It was released on July 13, 2004 on Geffen Records and peaked at number 60 on the Billboard 200. The first single released from the album was "Breaking the Broken."

Critical reception

Porcelain garnered a positive reception from music critics. At Metacritic, which assigns a normalized rating out of 100 to reviews from mainstream critics, the album received an average score of 62, based on 19 reviews.

Johnny Loftus of AllMusic praised the album for maintaining Sparta's "caustic intellectualism" without compromising their musical integrity through "label-side meddling" or adhering to "a cliquey music-fan nation", highlighting "From Now to Never" for crystalizing the band's musicianship: "At nearly nine minutes, it renders each facet of Porcelain in perfect miniature, and emphasizes Sparta's stance as a group working faithfully within the system, but also staunchly and refreshingly outside of it." Pitchfork contributor Brian Howe noted how the band's sound became "grandiose and questing, with scintillating, spacious atmospheres" throughout the record, praising the "complex and inventive" arrangements found on "While Oceana Sleeps" and "Lines in Sand", concluding that: "Porcelain is food for sheer bodily exaltation. It's an imperative and ornate exhortation to lay open your nerves and unabashedly, unapologetically feel." Rolling Stone contributor Jenny Eliscu commended the band's "tight and powerful" musicianship on "While Oceana Sleeps" and "Hiss the Villain" but felt it was "rote emo-core, all predictable quiet-loud shifts and overwrought vocal melodies" that didn't elevate them above ATDI, concluding that: "Mostly, though, it's just kind of boring."  Darcie Stevens of The Austin Chronicle criticized the album for lacking the "ragged edges and complicated time changes" from Sparta's predecessor and instead contained lackluster artistry and "Dashboard Confessional lyrics." A writer for Spin was critical of the band not evolving their Wiretap Scars sound to just "lazily tread" through a modern rock manual that elicits "sticker-on-the-case singles ("Breaking the Broken")" and ventures into "power-ballad turf ("Lines in Sand", "From Now to Never")".

Track listing

Note
 According to an interview with Jim Ward, "P.O.M.E" stands for 'Paris Of the Middle East', referring to Beirut - which is Hajjar's birthplace.

Bonus tracks
 "Farewell Ruins" (Japan/UK/iTunes bonus track) – 3:17
 "Bombs & Us" (Japan bonus track) – 3:33

Personnel
Jim Ward – guitar, vocals
Paul Hinojos – guitar
Matt Miller – bass
Tony Hajjar – drums
Charlie Bisharat – violin
Mario de Leon – violin
Joel Derouin - violin
Sara Parkins- violin
Matt Funes – viola
Dan Smith – cello
Larry Corbett – cello
Suzie Takayama – orchestration, string conductor

Charts

References

2004 albums
Sparta (band) albums
Geffen Records albums
Albums recorded at Sunset Sound Recorders